The Mackenzie River is a river located in Central Queensland, Australia. The Mackenzie River is a major tributary of the Fitzroy River, part of the largest river catchment flowing to the eastern coast of Australia.

Course and features
The river is joined by twenty-four tributaries including the Isaac and Connors rivers and Funnel Creek. Northeast of Duaringa, the Mackenzie is joined by the Dawson River and together they form the Fitzroy River. From source to mouth, the Mackenzie River descends  over its  course.

The Bingegang Weir near Middlemount contains barramundi, southern saratoga and golden perch. The Bedford Weir and Tartrus Weir are also stocked with barramundi. Bedford Weir is popular with water-skiers and camping is permitted adjacent to the reservoir.

History
Yetimarala (also known as Jetimarala, Yetimaralla, and Bayali) is an Australian Aboriginal language of Central Queensland. Its traditional language region is within the local government areas of Central Highlands Region, on the Boomer Range and Broadsound Range and the Fitzroy River, Killarney Station, Mackenzie River and Isaac River. Garingbal, a language of Central Queensland was also spoken in this region, primarily around the Bowen Basin. The Garingbal language region includes the landscape within the local government boundaries of Central Highlands Regional Council.

The first European to discover the river was Ludwig Leichhardt in 1844; he was a German explorer who explored many parts of Queensland and the Northern Territory.

See also

References

External links

Rivers of Queensland
Central Queensland